Cadfan ap Iago (c. 569 – c. 625) was King of Gwynedd (reigned c. 616 – c. 625). Little is known of the history of Gwynedd from this period, and information about Cadfan and his reign is minimal.

The historical person is known only from his appearance in royal genealogies, from his grant to Saint Beuno for the monastery at Clynnog Fawr, and from his inscribed gravestone in Llangadwaladr church.

Cadfan was the son and successor of King Iago ap Beli, and is listed in the royal genealogies of the Harleian genealogies and in Jesus College MS. 20. Cadfan came to the throne near the time of the Battle of Chester in 616, in which the Northumbrians under Æthelfrith decisively defeated the neighboring Welsh Kingdom of Powys and then massacred the monks of Bangor Is Coed. However, there is no evidence that Gwynedd had any part in the battle, so Cadfan's accession at that time appears to be no more than coincidence.

Cadfan was succeeded as king by his son, Cadwallon ap Cadfan.

Gravestone
Cadfan's gravestone is at Llangadwaladr on Anglesey, a short distance from the ancient llys of the kings of Gwynedd, and reputed to be their royal burial ground. The inscription refers to him as sapientisimus, and as this term is historically used for ecclesiastics, it suggests that at some point, Cadfan had resigned as king to live a consecrated life.

Saint Beuno 
Saint Beuno and the monastery at Clynnog Fawr are often cited in conjunction with Cadfan. An 1828 article by P. B. Williams in the Cymmrodorion cited a manuscript stating that a local prince named 'Gwytheint' gave Clynnog Fawr to God and Saint Beuno, who was then Abbot at the monastery at Clynnog, and that the donation was free from taxes and obligations forever. It goes on to say that Beuno founded a convent at Clynnog in 616, and that Cadfan was Beuno's great patron, promising him extensive lands. The promise was carried out by Cadfan's son, King Cadwallon, and that Cadwallon was given a golden sceptre worth 60 cows as a token of acknowledgment. (Life of Saint Beino) (Rees was the editor of the 1828 Cymmrodorion that published P. B. Williams' account.)

There are minor variations of these accounts, sometimes with the details rearranged, such as in Rice Rees' 1836 Essay on the Welsh Saints, where he says that Cadfan (rather than his son Cadwallon) was given the golden sceptre by Beuno.

Fictionalization by and after Geoffrey of Monmouth 
The largely fictional stories of ancient Britain written by Geoffrey of Monmouth use the names of many historical personages as characters, and the use of these names is a literary convenience made in order to advance the plot of Geoffrey's stories. One of these stories uses the names of Cadfan and other contemporary people, telling of how a certain Edwin spent his exiled youth at the court of King Cadfan, growing up alongside Cadfan's son, the future King Cadwallon. There is no historical basis for this story, as is readily acknowledged in the preface of works on the subject.

Nevertheless, a "traditional" story arose blending Geoffrey's fiction with known history, implying that the future King Edwin of Northumbria had actually spent his youth at the court of King Cadfan, growing up alongside Cadfan's son, the future King Cadwallon. In point of fact, Cadwallon and Edwin were enemies with no known youthful connections: King Edwin invaded Gwynedd and drove King Cadwallon into exile, and it would be Cadwallon, in alliance with Penda of Mercia, who would ultimately defeat and kill Edwin in 633 at the Battle of Hatfield Chase. The story that they had spent an idyllic youth together may have had a romantic appeal.

What is known from history is that in 588 King Ælla of Deira died, and Æthelfrith of Bernicia took the opportunity to invade and conquer Deira, driving Ælla's  3-year old infant son, the future Edwin of Northumbria, into exile. Edwin would eventually ally himself with Rædwald of East Anglia in 616, defeating and killing Æthelfrith and becoming one of Northumbria's most successful kings. Edwin's life in exile is unknown, and there is no historical basis for placing him at the court of King Cadfan.

See also
Kings of Wales family trees

Notes

References

Sources

560s births
620s deaths
Year of birth uncertain
Year of death uncertain
Monarchs of Gwynedd
7th-century Welsh monarchs